The T385, also known as LG Cookie Smart is a touchscreen mobile phone, single sim version of LG T375. LG continues to be targeted at the entry-level touchscreen markets keeping the cost of the T385 as low as possible by omitting some of the features found on high-end products, such as GPS and 3G.

It is using ARM11 CPU at 208 MHz.

Its main feature is a 3.2-inch, 240 x 320 pixel touchscreen. The T385 also has support for auto-rotating display. It has a 2.0 MP Camera with MPEG-4 video capture at 15 frame/s. There is support for video playback up to 29 frames per second. The T385 has a stereo FM radio with RDS. Other software include a document viewer for DOC, XLS, and PDF formats, and a Java MIDP 2.0 games player. Standby time is up to 696 hours and talk time is up to 14 hours.

A nearly-identical model, the LG T580 has exactly same specifications as LG T385, except it uses MTK-based CPU, has silver battery cover and a 32 MB more RAM than in LG T385 of which has only 64 MB of RAM and black or red battery cover.

Multimedia support 
LG T370/T375/T385:
Supported audio capabilities: MP3, WAV, eAAC+
Supported video capabilities: MPEG-4 H.263
LG T580:
Supported audio capabilities: MP3, WAV, WMA, eAAC+
Supported video capabilities: MPEG-4 H.263, H.264

References

External links 
 Official LG T385 website
 LG T385 Wallpapers Download Link

T385
Mobile phones introduced in 2012